is a Japanese voice actress and narrator associated with Mausu Promotion (formerly Ezaki Productions). She is best known for her portrayal of Motoko Kusanagi in the Ghost in the Shell film and franchise. She also voices Konan in the Naruto series, Caster in the Fate/stay night series, Lisa Lisa in JoJo's Bizarre Adventure, Claudette in Queen's Blade, Francis Midford in Black Butler, and Karura in Utawarerumono, Bayonetta in the Bayonetta series, Hanami in Jujutsu Kaisen and Kyrie Ushiromiya from Umineko no Naku Koro ni. She attended the Tokyo Announcement Academy where she studied voice training in 1991. In 2012, a Biglobe poll named her the voice actress with the sexiest voice.

Tanaka is married and has a sister. She also considers Kikuko Inoue to be her best friend. Overseas and on home soil in Japan, Atsuko is well known for being cast in semi-mature female action roles, noted for playing the Japanese dub voice of Lara Croft from the Tomb Raider franchise for five games in a row, before being succeeded by Takako Honda.

Filmography

Animation

Films

Video games

Drama CD

Tokusatsu

Dubbing roles

Live action

Animation

Notes

References

External links
 Official agency profile 
 2nd GIG interview 
 
 

1962 births
Living people
Japanese video game actresses
Japanese voice actresses
Mausu Promotion voice actors
People from Maebashi
Voice actresses from Gunma Prefecture
20th-century Japanese actresses
21st-century Japanese actresses
Ferris University alumni